This page shows the standings and results for Group D of the UEFA Euro 2012 qualifying tournament.

Standings

Matches
Group D fixtures were negotiated between the participants at a meeting in Luxembourg on 19 February 2010.

Goalscorers

Discipline

References 

Group D
2010–11 in French football
qual
2011–12 in Bosnia and Herzegovina football
2010–11 in Bosnia and Herzegovina football
2010–11 in Luxembourgian football
2011–12 in Luxembourgian football
2010–11 in Romanian football
2011–12 in Romanian football
2010–11 in Albanian football
2011–12 in Albanian football
2010 in Belarusian football
2011 in Belarusian football